is a public university in the town of Tobe, Ehime Prefecture, Japan. The predecessor of the school was founded in 1988, and it was chartered as a university in 2004.

External links
 Official website 

Educational institutions established in 1988
Public universities in Japan
Universities and colleges in Ehime Prefecture
Medical schools in Japan
1988 establishments in Japan
Tobe, Ehime